Karl Kreibich (21 August 1867 – 26 February 1949) was an ethnic German politician in the First Czechoslovak Republic.

Biography
Kreibich was born in Bratislava on 21 August 1867. He worked as a wholesale trader in Bratislava. On 21 February 1933, he replaced Rudolf Böhm as Senator in the Czechoslovak National Assembly, following Böhm's death. He represented the German section of the Provincial Christian-Socialist Party in the Senate. Kreibich's Senate mandate ended in 1935.

Kreibich died on 26 February 1949.

References

1867 births
1949 deaths
Politicians from Bratislava
People from the Kingdom of Hungary
Carpathian German people
Provincial Christian-Socialist Party politicians
Members of the Senate of Czechoslovakia (1929–1935)
Place of death missing
Businesspeople from Bratislava